The Women's tournament of the Volleyball competition at the 2015 Pacific Games was held from July 11–18, 2015 at the Taurama Aquatic Centre Courts in Port Moresby. American Samoa won the gold medal by defeating Tahiti in the final.

Participating teams
Nine women's teams participated in the tournament:

Pool A

Pool B

Preliminary round

Pool A

|}

|}

Pool B

|}

|}

Final round

Semifinals

|}

Seventh place game

|}

Fifth place game

|}

Bronze medal match

|}

Gold medal match

|}

See also
 Volleyball at the 2015 Pacific Games – Men's tournament

References

Pacific Games Women
Volleyball at the 2015 Pacific Games